Khenchela Province is a province (wilaya) in the Aures region in Algeria.

History
The province was created from parts of Oum el Bouaghi Province and Tébessa Province in 1984.

Administrative division
The province is divided into 8 districts, which are further divided into 21 communes or municipalities.

Districts
 Khenchela, as a district and capital Khenchela

Communes

 Aïn Touila
 Babar
 Baghai
 Bouhmama
 Chelia
 Cherchar
 Djellal
 El Hamma
 El Mahmal
 El Oueldja
 Ensigha
 Fais (Taouzianat)
 Kais
 Khenchela
 Khirane
 M'Sara
 M'Toussa
 Ouled Rechache
 Remila
 Tamza
 Yabous

References 

 
Provinces of Algeria
States and territories established in 1984